Fong Lim is an electoral division of the Legislative Assembly in Australia's Northern Territory.

The district is named after Alec Fong Lim, Lord Mayor of Darwin from 1984 to 1990. There were 5,555 people enrolled in the division in August 2020.

The seat is currently held by Mark Monaghan of the Labor Party.

Geography
Fong Lim is located in the suburban corridor south of the Stuart Highway in Darwin. It takes in the suburbs of Bayview, Stuart Park, Woolner and The Narrows, and parts of Coconut Grove and Ludmilla.

History
Fong Lim largely replaced the abolished seat of Millner, and was renamed in honour of former Darwin Lord Mayor Alec Fong Lim. It was first contested at the 2008 election. Based on the results of the previous election, it was calculated to have a Labor majority of 61.5% to 38.5% versus the Liberal Party. It was contested by the incumbent member for Millner, Labor MP Matthew Bonson, who lost to the Country Liberal Party's candidate, former federal MP Dave Tollner, on a swing of 13 percent. Tollner was reelected in 2012 as the CLP won government.

However, a redistribution ahead of the 2016 election dramatically altered Fong Lim. Virtually all of the eastern portion of the seat was transferred to the new seat of Spillett, making Fong Lim a more compact Darwin-based seat.  This all but erased the CLP majority in the seat, reducing it to an extremely marginal 0.2 percent.  Tollner tried to win CLP preselection for Spillett, but lost to Lia Finocchiaro. Meanwhile, Jeff Collins won the seat for Labor on a swing of over eight percent. Collins was expelled from his party in 2018. Two years later, he joined the Territory Alliance, but came in third in the 2020 general election as Labor's Mark Monaghan won back the seat.

Members for Fong Lim

Election results

References

External links
 Division Profile at the Northern Territory Electoral Commission

Electoral divisions of the Northern Territory